Ekaterina Avramova (born 12 November 1991, in Sofia) is a Bulgarian-born swimmer competing for Turkey.

Career 
She learned how to swim at age 7 and her first coach was Jorj Stankovich. Her mother had represented Bulgaria in water polo.  Avramova started her professional swimming career in 2007 representing Bulgaria at the European Short Course championship in Debrecen (Hungary). From that year until end of 2013 she represented Bulgaria in every major international competition. She broke the national backstroke records more than 70 times, both LC and SC.

In 2009, she moved from Bulgaria, to live and continue her training in London, U.K. as part of Ealing Swimming Club with Head Coach David Heathcock. Avramova qualified for the London Olympic Games in 2012 on both 100m and 200m backstroke.

After Bulgaria cut off funding for her following the 2012 Summer Olympics, she decided in August 2014 to move to Turkey accepting Turkish citizenship, and competing for Turkey.

Avramova was semi-finalist in the 2011 World Long Course Championship; Finalist in 50m,100m and 200m at the European Short Course Championship in 2011;2016 European Championships finalist in 50m and 100m backstroke and 200m back semi-finalist, 5 timed gold medalist at the Islamic Games in Baku 2017; 2 times bronze medalist at the Mediterranean Games in 2018;  2018 European Championships semi-finalist in 200m backstroke, and World Championship finalist in the 4×100 m freestyle relay. She has competed at two Olympics, competing at London 2012 for Bulgaria and at Rio 2016 for Turkey.

Ekaterina Avramova is the current Turkish and Bulgarian National Record holder in all backstroke events both long and short course. She is a member of ENKA Spor Kulubu since 2018, as prior to that she competed for Galatasaray and Fenerbahce.

As of December 2022, she is the Turkish record holder in the 100 and 200 m backstroke shortcourse, and the 50 m backstroke long course (she is also still the Bulgarian record holder in the 200 m backstroke long course), and was part of the teams that hold the national record in the women's 4 x 50 m medley relay and mixed 4 x 50 m freestyle relay (shortcourse) and mixed 4 x 100 m freestyle and 4 x 100 m medley relays (long course).

References

External links
 
 

Living people
1991 births
Sportspeople from Sofia
Turkish female backstroke swimmers
Bulgarian female swimmers
Olympic swimmers of Bulgaria
Swimmers at the 2012 Summer Olympics
Bulgarian expatriate sportspeople in England
Bulgarian expatriate sportspeople in Turkey
Bulgarian emigrants to Turkey
Naturalized citizens of Turkey
Turkish female swimmers
Galatasaray Swimming swimmers
Swimmers at the 2016 Summer Olympics
Olympic swimmers of Turkey
Swimmers at the 2018 Mediterranean Games
Mediterranean Games bronze medalists for Turkey
Mediterranean Games medalists in swimming
Bulgarian people of Turkish descent
Swimmers at the 2022 Mediterranean Games
Islamic Solidarity Games competitors for Turkey
Islamic Solidarity Games medalists in swimming